Tourist Train (Italian: Treno popolare) is a 1933 Italian comedy film directed by Raffaello Matarazzo and starring Marcello Spada, Lina Gennari and Carlo Petrangeli. The film portrays the comic adventures of a group of summertime travellers. It was shot on the Florence-Rome railway and in Orvieto. It was one of a number of films made during the 1930s whose realism pointed in the direction of the later development of Italian neorealism.

Cast
Marcello Spada as Carlo
Lina Gennari as Lina
Carlo Petrangeli as Giovanni
Cesare Zoppetti as un viaggiatore
Maria Denis as Maria
Jone Frigerio as viaggiatrice
Raffaello Matarazzo as direttore di banda
Giuseppe Pierozzi as Il viaggiatore abusivo 
Gino Viotti as Il signore anziano con papillon 
Umberto Sacripante as Un viaggiatore 
 Aldo Frosi as Un viaggiatore  
 Giuseppe Ricagno as Un viaggiatore

References

Bibliography 
 Brunetta, Gian Piero. The History of Italian Cinema: A Guide to Italian Film from Its Origins to the Twenty-first Century. Princeton University Press, 2009.

External links 

 

1933 films
Italian comedy films
1933 comedy films
1930s Italian-language films
Films directed by Raffaello Matarazzo
Films set in Italy
Films shot in Italy
Italian black-and-white films
1930s Italian films